Minuscule 865 (in the Gregory-Aland numbering), A502 (von Soden), is a 15th-century Greek minuscule manuscript of the New Testament on paper. The manuscript has complex context, no marginalia.

Description 

The codex contains the text of the four Gospels on 123 paper leaves (size ), with a catena. It has some lacunae (John 18:10-21:25). The text is written in one column per page, 29 lines per page.
The biblical text is surrounded by a catena. The commentary is of Chrysostom's authorship.
The text was corrected.

Text 
Kurt Aland did not place the Greek text of the codex in any Category.

History 

C. R. Gregory dated the manuscript to the 15th century. Currently the manuscript is dated by the INTF to the 15th century.

The manuscript was added to the list of New Testament manuscripts by Gregory (865e). Gregory saw it in 1886.

Currently the manuscript is housed at the Vatican Library (Gr. 1472), in Rome.

See also 

 List of New Testament minuscules
 Biblical manuscript
 Textual criticism
 Minuscule 864

References

Further reading

External links 
 
 248 images of the codex

Greek New Testament minuscules
15th-century biblical manuscripts
Manuscripts of the Vatican Library